The canton of Goussainville is an administrative division of the Val-d'Oise department, Île-de-France region, northern France. Its borders were modified at the French canton reorganisation which came into effect in March 2015. Its seat is in Goussainville.

It consists of the following communes:

Chennevières-lès-Louvres
Épiais-lès-Louvres
Goussainville
Louvres
Marly-la-Ville
Saint-Witz
Survilliers
Vémars
Villeron

References

Cantons of Val-d'Oise